John Barnard or Bernard, D.D. (baptised 10 November 1628-17 August 1683), was the biographer of Peter Heylyn.

Barnard was the son of John Barnard, and was born at Caistor, Lincolnshire. He was educated at the grammar school of his native place, and at Cambridge, where he was a pensioner of Queens' College. In 1648 he proceeded to Oxford, where, by preferment of the board of visitors, he was granted the degree of B.A. on 15 April, and on 29 September following was presented to a fellowship of Lincoln College. In 1651 he proceeded to his M.A. degree, and became then for some time a preacher in and near Oxford. He married the daughter of Dr. Peter Heylyn at Abingdon, and afterwards purchased the perpetual advowson of the living of Waddington, near Lincoln, which he held for some time, together with that of Gedney, also in Lincolnshire. Conforming after the Restoration, he was made prebendary of Asgardby in Lincoln Cathedral on 13 April 1672, and in the year 1669 was granted the degrees of B.D. and D.D. in succession.

Barnard was the author of a pamphlet in three sheets quarto, entitled Censura Cleri, against scandalous ministers not fit to be restored to the church's livings in prudence, piety, and fame. This was published in the latter end of 1659 or beginning of 1660, ‘to prevent such from being restored to their livings as had been ejected by the godly party in 1654–55.’ His name is not set to this pamphlet, and Anthony a Wood says he did not care afterwards, when he saw how the event proved, to be known as its author. He is best known as the author of Theologo-Historicus, a true life of the most reverend divine and excellent historian, Peter Heylyn, D.D., sub-dean of Windsor (London, 1683, 8vo). This was published, according to the author, to correct the errors, supply the defects, and confute the calumnies of George Vernon, M.A., rector of Burton in Gloucester, who had brought out a life of Dr. Heylyn in 1682. Printed with Theologo-Historicus was an answer to Mr. Baxter's false accusation of Dr. Heylyn. Barnard also wrote a catechism for the use of his parish, and left behind him a manuscript tract against Socinianism, which was never printed. He died aged 54 on 17 August 1683 at Newark-on-Trent, while on a journey to the Spa, and was buried in his own church of Waddington.

References

Year of birth missing
1683 deaths
17th-century English writers
17th-century English male writers
English biographers
People from Caistor
Alumni of Queens' College, Cambridge
Fellows of Lincoln College, Oxford
English pamphleteers
English male non-fiction writers
People from North Kesteven District